Brimm is a surname. Notable people with the surname include:

Henry Brimm (1922–1994), American boxer
Melvin LaThomas Brimm (born 1987), American singer-songwriter, producer, dancer-choreographer, and actor

See also
Brimm Medical Arts High School in New Jersey, United States